The Solano was a large railroad ferry, built as a reinforced paddle steamer with independently powered sidewheels by the Central Pacific Railroad, that carried entire trains across the Carquinez Strait between Benicia and Port Costa in California, daily for 51 years from 1879 to 1930.  When launched, the Solano was the largest ferry of its kind in the world, a record held for 35 years until 1914 when she was joined by her sister ship, the Contra Costa, which was 13 feet longer.

Design 
The Solano was designed by Arthur Brown, the superintendent of bridges and buildings for Central Pacific Railroad, who reinforced the ferryboat much like a rail bridge, using four wooden Pratt trusses longitudinally under the deck of her four sets of rails. She was powered by two 2,000-horsepower walking beam steam engines. Each engine, with a 5-foot bore and 11-foot stroke cylinder, drove a paddle wheel that in turn drove the ship through the water. With two side paddle wheels operating independently, the Solano had the maneuverability it needed to handle the currents (about 8 mph) of Carquinez Strait.  With two pilot rooms, one at each end, there was no need to turn the ship around for return trips.

The ferry slips and approaches were also designed by Arthur Brown.  The slip at Benicia reached out into the strait diagonally downstream, whereas the slip at Port Costa, being further downstream from Benicia, pointed directly upstream. The distance across was about one mile, only thirteen lengths of the Solano; the designed time in transit including starting and stopping was nine minutes.  The 100-foot long apron or linkspan on each slip had four sets of rails, matching the four sets on the ferry to facilitate loading and unloading, and was hinged and balanced by weights and pontoons to accommodate the nine-foot tides. 

The Solano, named for the county in which Benicia sits, was built in 1879 in Oakland, California near the end of Long Wharf. She commenced trials on 24 November 1879 from Meigg's Wharf, with 75 selected guests, including Charles Crocker and Arthur Brown, on a trip around Alcatraz and arrived at Benicia with great fanfare, which included a military band and a twenty-six gun salute. She could travel at about 12 mph, though on the first day of her trial did not exceed 8 mph.

She was constructed and operated by the Central Pacific Railroad to ferry entire trains (up to 48 freight cars at a time) on the Central Pacific transcontinental line to and from the San Francisco Bay Area.  Once in service, the transcontinental railroad was re-routed from its original 1869 120-mile course from Sacramento to Oakland, via Altamont Pass and Niles Canyon, to the 1879 more level 92-mile course from Sacramento to Benicia and, via the Solano, to Oakland. Before her sister ship, Contra Costa, was constructed, Solano was the largest ferryboat ever built.

Operation 

The Solano began regular service between Benicia and Port Costa in December 1879. A typical operation was described in detail by Harris in 1890: "A passenger train of, say, ten cars comes to the slip. During its pause of a minute, the train has been uncoupled in the middle and a switching engine has been attached to its rear; the regular engine proceeds with the forward half of the train on to the boat, the switching engine pushes the rear half on another track of the boat, the steamer is cast off with the entire train and both engines as cargo..." The time card for the station of Benicia on the north and Port Costa on the south of the Straits allowed twenty-five minutes for the entire operation, including embarkation, ferriage, landing and station stops. This feat was accomplished with two watches of sixteen men each.

Apart from a few drydocks for rebuilding and upgrading, the Solano was in continuous service, 24 hours a day, between Benicia and Port Costa for 51 years, from 1 December 1879 to 15 October 1930. In 1904 she was making thirty six to forty six crossings every 24 hours, transporting about 115,000 freight cars and 56,000 passenger cars a year. Her sister ship, Contra Costa, was built in 1914 with the propelling machinery under the main deck, which made her main deck completely open for four parallel tracks with no center post. She was slightly larger (13 feet longer) than Solano and thus was the largest rail ferryboat. Contra Costa was named for the county in which Port Costa is located.

By 1927, the two ferries had reached their maximum capacity. The railroad bridge opened on 15 October 1930 and the two railroad ferries were decommissioned. The railroad bridge continues today to serve the Union Pacific and Amtrak railroads. 

Following the opening of the railroad bridge, Solano and Contra Costa were dismantled and sold for scrap.  However, what remains of the Solano, the A frame of her walking beam engine, can still be seen where she was scuttled to create a breakwater in the San Joaquin River near Antioch, California.

References

External links
 
 
 
 

Ferries of California
Train ferries
Sidewheel steamboats of California
Transportation in the San Francisco Bay Area
History of the San Francisco Bay Area
Ships built in Oakland, California
Ships sunk as breakwaters
1878 ships